Peter William Welch (30 March 1922 – 20 November 1984) was a British actor who appeared in television programmes including Dixon of Dock Green, Z-Cars, Spy Trap, Softly, Softly, Doctor Who and Danger Man with Patrick McGoohan. He spent several years touring in the theatre with a repertory company he founded, and began playing character parts in films from the mid 1950s.

Filmography
 Dial 999 (1955)
 The Long Arm (1956)
 Five Clues to Fortune (1957)
 The Admirable Crichton (1957)
 The Silent Enemy (1958)
 The House of the Seven Hawks (1959)
 The Secret Partner (1961)
 A Prize of Arms (1962)
 Calculated Risk (1963)
 The Secret of Blood Island (1964)
  Jude the Obscure (1971) - Policeman

TV
 The Adventures of Robin Hood (1957–58) - Wounded Man/Sheriff's Servant/Ambassador/Lt. Howard (4 episodes)
 No Hiding Place (1959–67) - Joe Denham/McBride/Linker/Wilkie/Benny Gimbal (5 episodes)
 Dixon of Dock Green (1963–68) - Albert Fenwick/Jock/Sgt. Kelly/Harry Comer/Arnold Russell (5 episodes)
 Emergency-Ward 10 (1963) - Gunner Clarke (6 episodes)
 Spy Trap (1972–75) - Det. Supt. Clark (26 episodes)
 Emmerdale (1977) - Mr. Gunnarson (4 episodes)

References

External links

1922 births
1984 deaths
English male television actors
People from St Pancras, London
20th-century British male actors